Trans-Siberian Pathfinders is a South Korean variety show. The show broadcast from September 26 to November 21, 2019 on Thursday 11 pm (KST).

Synopsis 
Five actors, who are good friends, take the Trans-Siberian Railway train to travel from Vladivostok to Moscow, Russia. The train will pass through a total of 126 stations including Khabarovsk, Belogorsk, Skovorodino, Mariinsk, Chernyshevsk, Ulan-Ude, Omsk, Tyumen, Balezino and Kirov.

Airtime

Cast

List of episode and ratings 
In this table,  represent the lowest ratings and  represent the highest ratings.

References

External links 

 Official website 
 

South Korean variety television shows
South Korean reality television series
2019 South Korean television series debuts
2019 South Korean television series endings
TVN (South Korean TV channel) original programming
South Korean travel television series